Mohamed Amer Al-Rashed Al-Malky (born 1 December 1962) is a retired athlete from Oman who specialized in the 400 metres. He competed at the Olympic Games in 1984, 1988 1992, and 2000, an eighth place from 1988 being his best result.

His personal best time was 44.56 seconds, achieved in August 1988 in Budapest. He is the current national record holder for Oman.

References

External links
 

1962 births
Living people
Omani male sprinters
Olympic athletes of Oman
Athletes (track and field) at the 1984 Summer Olympics
Athletes (track and field) at the 1988 Summer Olympics
Athletes (track and field) at the 1992 Summer Olympics
Asian Games medalists in athletics (track and field)
Athletes (track and field) at the 1986 Asian Games
Athletes (track and field) at the 1990 Asian Games
World Athletics Championships athletes for Oman
Asian Games gold medalists for Oman
Asian Games bronze medalists for Oman
Medalists at the 1986 Asian Games
Medalists at the 1990 Asian Games